Henry Bird Goodwin (4 December 1903–1989) was a Scottish footballer who played in the Football League for Portsmouth and Reading.

References

1903 births
1989 deaths
Scottish footballers
Association football forwards
English Football League players
Benburb F.C. players
Shawfield F.C. players
Bo'ness F.C. players
Portsmouth F.C. players
Reading F.C. players
Colwyn Bay F.C. players
Worcester City F.C. players
Glentoran F.C. players